The German torpedo boat T35 was one of fifteen Type 39 torpedo boats built for the Kriegsmarine (German Navy) during World War II. Completed in late 1944, she was assigned to convoy escort duties and supporting German forces in the Baltic. The ship escorted a heavy cruiser in January 1945 as she bombarded Soviet troops and helped to evacuate troops and refugees from advancing Soviet forces in May. T35 was allocated to the United States after the war, but was turned over to the French Navy in 1947 to be used as a source of spare parts. She was stricken from the Navy List in 1952 and subsequently sold for scrap.

Design and description
The Type 39 torpedo boat was conceived as a general-purpose design, much larger than preceding German torpedo boats. Their crew numbered 206 officers and sailors. The Type 39s were fitted with a pair of geared steam turbine sets, each driving one shaft, using steam from four high-pressure water-tube boilers.

At war's end T-35 mounted four  SK C/32 guns in single mounts protected by gun shields; one forward of the superstructure, one between the funnels, and two aft, one superfiring over the other. Anti-aircraft defense was provided by four  AA guns of unknown types in two twin-gun mounts on platforms abaft the rear funnel and two shielded single-gun mounts on the bridge wings, together with eight  C/38 guns. One quadruple mount was positioned on the aft superstructure and two twin-gun mounts were fitted on platforms in front of the bridge. The torpedo boat carried six above-water  torpedo tubes in two triple mounts amidships and could also carry 30 mines; the full complement of 60 mines made the ships top-heavy which could be dangerous in bad weather. For anti-submarine work she was fitted with a S-Gerät sonar and four depth charge launchers. By the end of the war, T-35 was equipped with a FuMO 21 radar on the foremast, a FuMO 63 K Hohentwiel radar on the searchlight platform and various FumB radar detectors.

Construction and career
T35 was ordered on 20 January 1941 from Schichau, laid down at their  Elbing, East Prussia, shipyard on 20 April 1943 as yard number 1517, launched on 12 December 1943 and commissioned on 7 October 1944. After working up for the next several months, the boat was one of the escorts for the heavy cruiser  as the latter ship supported a German counterattack against advancing Soviet forces near Cranz, East Prussia, on 29–30 January 1945. On 5 May, T35 helped to ferry 45,000 refugees from East Prussia to Copenhagen, Denmark, and returned to transport 20,000 more to Glücksburg, Germany, on the 9th. The boat was allocated to the United States when the Allies divided the surviving ships of the Kriegsmarine amongst themselves in late 1945. T35 was taken to the United States for testing and renamed DD-935. She was towed to France in 1947 where she was cannibalized for spare parts. The ship was stricken from the Navy List on 3 October 1952 and subsequently scrapped.

Notes

Citations

References

External links
 T35 at german navy.de

Type 39 torpedo boats
1943 ships
Ships built by Schichau
Ships built in Elbing